Yvan Richard (born 11 December 1950) is a French ski jumper. He competed in the normal hill and large hill events at the 1972 Winter Olympics.

References

1950 births
Living people
French male ski jumpers
Olympic ski jumpers of France
Ski jumpers at the 1972 Winter Olympics
Place of birth missing (living people)